This is a list of notable faculty and alumni from the University of Nigeria.

Politics, Law and Government
Charles Chukwuma Soludo, Governor of Anambra State (2022-Present)
Osita Chidoka, Former  Corps Marshal and Chief Executive of Federal Road Safety Corps, and Former Minister of Aviation. 
Tony Momoh, Journalist, Former Minister of Information and Culture (1986-1990), and Chairman, Congress for Progressive Change, (2011-2021).
Nkechi Ikpeazu, First lady of Abia State (2015-)
Gilbert Nnaji, Senator of the Federal Republic of Nigeria (Enugu East senatorial district, Enugu state)
Utazi Chukwuka, Senator of the Federal Republic of Nigeria (Enugu North senatorial district, Enugu State, 2015-)
Bassey Albert, Senator of the Federal Republic of Nigeria (Akwa Ibom North-East Senatorial District) (2015-), and former Commissioner for Finance Akwa Ibom State, Nigeria (2007 – 2014)
Fabian Ajogwu, Senior Advocate of Nigeria, and Founding Partner of Kenna Partners.
Uko Nkole, Member of the Federal House of Representatives
Chima Centus Nweze, Jurist, Justice of the Supreme Court of Nigeria, and Justice of the Nigerian courts of appeal
Nkeiruka Onyejeocha, Commissioner for Resources Management and Manpower Development, Abia state (2002-2003)-(2007-2011), Chairman, House Committee on Aviation (2011-2019), Member of the Federal House of Representatives 
Chukwuemeka Ujam, Member of the Federal House of Representatives (2015-2019)
Tony Nwoye, Member of the Federal House of Representatives
Ifeanyi Ugwuanyi, Governor of Enugu State, Nigeria (2015–present)
Okechukwu Enelamah, Minister of Industry, Trade, and Investment
Lam Adesina, pioneer class of 1963; Governor of Oyo State, Nigeria (1999–2003)
Mary Odili, Former First Lady of Rivers state, Nigeria (1999 - 2007), Associate Justice of the Supreme Court of Nigeria (2011–present)
Olisa Agbakoba, class of 1977 (Law); Senior Advocate of Nigeria; founder of Nigeria's foremost human rights organization, the Civil Liberties Organisation (CLO) and former president of the Nigerian Bar Association (2006–2008)
Dora Akunyili, Federal Minister of Information and Communication, Nigeria (2008–2010) and Director-General, National Agency for Food and Drug Administration and Control (NAFDAC)(2001 – 2008)
Sullivan Chime, Governor of Enugu State, Nigeria (2007 – 2015)
Ike Ekweremadu, Former Deputy Senate President, Nigeria (2007-2019)
Joy Emordi, class of 1979; Senator of the Federal Republic of Nigeria (Anambra North Senatorial Zone, Anambra State) 2005 – 2010
Akpan Isemin, Governor of Akwa Ibom State, Nigeria (1992–1993)
Ousman Jammeh, Gambian Foreign Minister (2009–2010)
Gregory Ngaji, class of 1977; Senator of the Federal Republic of Nigeria (Cross River North Senatorial constituency, Cross River) 2003 – 2011 
Chris Ngige, Governor of Anambra State, Nigeria (2003–2007) and Senator of the Federal Republic of Nigeria (Anambra State, Anambra Central Senatorial District), 2011 – 2015, Federal Minister of Labour and Employment, Nigeria (2015-Date)
Uchechukwu Sampson Ogah, Philanthropist, Federal Minister of state for mines and steel development, (2019–Present)
Kema Chikwe, Federal Minister of Transportation, 1999 - 2001 and Federal Minister of Aviation, 2001 - 2003
Chimaroke Nnamani, Senator of the Federal Republic of Nigeria (Enugu East Senatorial District, Enugu State) and Governor of Enugu State (1999–2007)
Christopher Nwankwo, Senator of the Federal Republic of Nigeria (Ebonyi North Senatorial District, Ebonyi State)
Anthony Agbo, Senator of the Federal Republic of Nigeria  (Ebonyi North Senatorial District, Ebonyi State)
Sonni Ogbuoji, Senator of the Federal Republic of Nigeria (Ebonyi South Senatorial District, Ebonyi State) (2011-2019)
Ben Nwankwo, Member of the Federal House of Representatives (1999-2003)
Peter Obi, Governor of Anambra State, Nigeria (2007–2014), and vice presidential candidate in the 2019 Nigerian general election under the People's Democratic Party. 
Peter Odili, Governor of Rivers State, Nigeria (1999–2007)
Gabriel Toby, Deputy Governor of Rivers State, Nigeria (1999 - 2007)
Sam Egwu, Senator of the Federal Republic of Nigeria ( Ebonyi North Senatorial Zone (2015 - ), former Governor of Ebonyi State (1999 -2007), Former Minister of Education.
Fabian Osuji, former Federal Minister of Education
Celestine Onwuliri, Honorable Commissioner for Agriculture & Natural Resources (1998-1998), Honorable Commissioner for Information, Culture, Youth and Sports, Imo state (1997-1998).
Viola Onwuliri, Professor of Biochemistry and Federal Minister of Foreign Affairs and Federal Minister of State for Education  (2011-2015), Deputy Governorship Candidate, Imo State (2011)
Oserheimen Osunbor, Governor of Edo State, Nigeria (2007–2008) and Senator of the Federal Republic of Nigeria (Edo State, Edo Central Senatorial District), 1999–2007
Niki Tobi, first person to earn a PhD in Law from University of Nigeria (1983); Associate Justice, Supreme Court of Nigeria (2002–2010)
Patrick Utomi, Presidential candidate for the African Democratic Congress (ADC) in the Nigerian April 2007 elections and former Director of the Center for Applied Economics, Lagos Business School, Pan African University
Emmanuel Ibe Kachikwu, Minister of State, Petroleum Resources (2015-2019) and former Group Managing Director, Nigerian National Petroleum Corporation (2015-2016)
Osita Ogbu, Professor of economics at the University of Nigeria. He was the Minister of National Planning from 2006 to 2007, and former Chief Economic Adviser to the President of Nigeria
Aloysius-Michaels Nnabugwu Okolie, Professor of political science and National President and Trustee of the Nigerian Political Science Association
Ojo Maduekwe, former Minister of Transportation (2001-2003), and former Minister of Foreign Affairs (2007-2003) 
Fidelia Njeze, Former Minister of State for Defence (2007-2008), Former Minister of State for Agriculture and Water Resources (2008-2010), Former Minister of Aviation (2010-2011), and Ambassador to Switzerland and Liechtenstein (2012-)
Ogbonna Okechukwu Onovo, Chairman of the National Drug Law Enforcement Agency (NDLEA) (1998-2000), and former Inspector General of the Nigerian Police (IGP) (2009-2010) 
Chinwe Obaji, first female Federal Minister of Education (2005-2006)

Banking and business
Godwin Emefiele, Group managing director/CEO, Zenith Bank Plc, Nigeria, Governor of the Central Bank of Nigeria (CBN) (2014-).
Obiageli Ezekwesili, Vice President (Africa Region), World Bank and Federal Minister of Education (2006–2007) and Solid Minerals Development (2005–2006), Nigeria and Senior Economic Advisor, AEDPI.
Arunma Oteh, Director-General, Securities and Exchange Commission (SEC), Nigeria, Vice-President for Corporate Services, African Development Bank Group (AfDB) (2006–2009, and Vice President and Treasurer, World Bank Group (2015-2018)
Charles Chukwuma Soludo, Governor Central Bank of Nigeria (CBN) (2004–2009), member of the Presidential Economic Advisory Council (PEAC) of Nigeria.
Herbert Wigwe, CEO Access Bank, Nigeria.
Nneka Onyeali-Ikpe, first Female Group managing director/CEO of Fidelity Bank Plc, Nigeria.
Simon Aranonu, accountant and Executive Director of Large Enterprises for Bank of Industry.
Tunde Lemo, CEO, Wema Bank Plc, Nigeria and former Deputy Governor of the Central Bank of Nigeria (CBN).
Cletus Ibeto, CEO and Founder of the Ibeto Group

Science, technology, engineering, and medicine
Anthonia Ifeyinwa Achike, agricultural economist and professor of Agricultural Economics
Betty Anyanwu-Akeredolu, pisciculturist, philanthropist, and the First Lady of Ondo State in Nigeria
Fabian Udekwu professor of surgery, cardiac surgeon, the first person to perform open-heart surgery in black Africa
Okwesilieze Nwodo, Governor of Enugu State, Nigeria (1992–1993)
Azikiwe Peter Onwualu (Born, 27 April 1959 at Anambra State, Nigeria) is a Nigerian professor of Agricultural engineering and former Director General and chief executive officer of the Raw Materials Research and Development Council (RMRDC) of Nigeria
Bennet Omalu (b.1968) class of 1990, physician, a forensic pathologist, professor, discoverer of the relationship of the neurological disease Chronic traumatic encephalopathy (CTE) to some concussions in American football

Academia
Francisca Nneka Okeke, Professor of Physics at the University of Nigeria, Nsukka 
Msugh Moses Kembe, Professor Statistics, and 5th substantive Vice chancellor of Benue State University
Celestine Onwuliri, Professor of Parasitology, Ag Vice Chancellor, University of Jos (2006-2006), and former Vice Chancellor, Federal University of Technology, Owerri (2006-2011)
Obinna Onwujekwe, Professor of Health Economics and Policy and Pharmacoeconomics in the Departments of Health Administration & Management and Pharmacology and Therapeutics, College of Medicine, University of Nigeria.
Jude Uzoma Ohaeri, Professor of Psychiatry at the University of Nigeria, Nsukka
Grace Chibiko Offorma, Scholar, Researcher, and Professor of Arts Education in the Faculty of Education, University of Nigeria, Nsukka.
Nancy Achebe,  Professor of library and information science, and first vice president of the Nigerian Schools Library Association (NSLA)
Maurice Iwu, Professor of Pharmacognosy at the University of Nigeria, Nsukka 
Ike Odimegwu, professor of philosophy and political philosopher
Joy Chinwe Eyisi, Professor of Igbo, Head of Department, English Language and Literature, Faculty of Arts, Nnamdi Azikiwe University, and Deputy Vice-Chancellor (Academic) of National Open University of Nigeria (NOUN).
Ikechukwu Dozie, professor of Microbiology (Medical Microbiology & Parasitology at the Federal University of Technology Owerri, Nigeria, and Member of American Society of Tropical Medicine & Hygiene (ASTMH). 
Jacob K. Olupona, Professor of African Religious Traditions and Chair of the Committee on African studies at the Harvard Divinity School with a joint appointment as Professor of African and African American Studies in the Faculty of Arts and Sciences at Harvard University
Tessy Okoli, Provost of Federal College of Education (Technical), Umunze
Chika Okeke-Agulu, Professor of African and African Diaspora Art History, Department of Art and Archaeology and Department of African American Studies, Princeton University.
Lilian Imuetinyan Salami, Professor of Home Economics/Nutritional Education and current Vice-Chancellor, University of Benin
Charles Esimone, Professor of pharmaceutics and current Vice Chancellor, Nnamdi Azikiwe University, Nigeria.
Chinedum Nwajiuba, Professor of Agricultural Economics and Vice Chancellor, Federal University Ndufu Alike Ikwo
Charles Arizechukwu Igwe, Professor of Soil Science and current Vice Chancellor, University of Nigeria
Francis Chukwuemeka Eze, professor of physics and vice chancellor of Federal University of Technology, Owerri.
Nnenna Oti, professor of soil science and current Vice-Chancellor of Federal University of Technology Owerri.

Literature
Uzoamaka Aniunoh, writer and actor
Nani Boi, screenwriter and author
Helen Uche Ibezim, educationist and  author 
Chijioke Amu-Nnadi, poet and author
Chuma Nwokolo, writer
Onyeka Nwelue, author and filmmaker
Uche Nduka, poet and writer
Uche Azikiwe, author
Nnorom Azuonye, playwright, and poet
Ifeoma Okoye, novelist
Chimamanda Ngozi Adichie, novelist and feminist icon
Chika Unigwe, novelist 
Unoma Azuah, writer and LGBTQ activist
Otosirieze Obi-Young, culture journalist and editor
Donatus Nwoga, critic and African literature scholar
Jeff Unaegbu, Writer, actor, artist, and documentary film maker.
Adaeze Atuegwu, author and disability inclusion advocate

Alumni
Eucharia Anunobi, Actress, Producer, and Pastor
Paul Onwuanibe, Founder/CEO Landmark Africa
Obi Cubana, Entrepreneur, founder and chair of Cubana Group.
Olisa Metuh, National Publicity Secretary of the People's Democratic Party.
Jacobs Edoite Edo, System Coordinator for the OPEC Fund for International Development.
Lucy Ejike, Paralympic Powerlifter.
Okechukwu Ibeanu, United Nations Special Rapporteur.
Cheluchi Onyemelukwe, Health Law expert, policy Consultant, Author, Senior Advocate of Nigeria, Founder and Executive Director, Centre of Health Ethics, Law, and Development (CHELD).
Kelechi Nwaneri, Artist
Obianuju Ekeocha, biomedical scientist and founder and president of Culture of Life Africa.
Nsima Ekere, Former Managing Director of Niger Delta Development Commission 2016-2018
Kelechi Amadi-Obi, Photographer and Publisher of Mania Magazine.
Noble Igwe, Blogger, Founder and Chief Executive Officer of 360 Group.
Akachukwu Sullivan Nwankpo, Politician
Chinwe Isaac, Actress
Emeka Ogboh, Artist
Nnenna Okore, Artist
Uti Nwachukwu, Winner of Big Brother Africa 5.
Ndidi Dike, Visual Artist
Eka Esu Williams, Immunologist and Activist.
Eleanor Nwadinobi, Medical Doctor, Women Health Activist, and first Nigerian president of Medical Women International Association.
Onigu Otite, Sociologist
Lam Adesina, Governor of Oyo State, Nigeria (1999–2003)
Akpan Isemin, Governor of Akwa Ibom State, Nigeria (1992–1993)
Dora Akunyili, Federal Minister of Information and Communication, Nigeria (2008–2010) and Director-General, National Agency for Food and Drug Administration and Control (NAFDAC)(2001 – 2008)
Chuka Momah, Nigerian sport reporter and administrator, and former president of the Nigerian Tennis Federation and the Confederation of African Tennis
Olorogun O'tega Emerhor, Chartered Accountant, Politician, and Businessman.
Kingsley Moghalu, political economist and politician
Okechukwu Nwadiuto Emuchay, Diplomat and former Nigeria's Consul-General to South Africa.
Clement Nwankwo, Lawyer, human right activist, and Executive Director of Policy and Legal Advocacy Centre
Emmanuel Iwuanyanwu, Politician and Businessman
Onyema Ugochukwu, Economist, Journalist, Politician, and the first Executive Chairman of the Niger Delta Development Commission (NDDC)
Peter Onu, Nigerian Diplomat, philanthropist and Assistant Secretary-General to the Organisation of African Unity
Chikwe Ihekweazu, Epidemiologist and Public Health Physician, Former Director-General, Nigeria Centre for Disease Control (NCDC) (2016 - 2021), World Health Organization’s Assistant Director-General of Health Emergency Intelligence  (2021-)
Chinelo Anohu Director-General, National Pension Commission (PenCom), Head and Senior Director of AfDB's Africa Investment Forum (2019–present).
Obiwon, Musician, singer, songwriter, recording artist, minister, evangelist, event host, media consultant
Emeka Nwokedi, Conductor and music director.
Moji Christianah Adeyeye, Director-General, National Agency for Food and Drug Administration and Control (NAFDAC) (2017–present); First African Woman Fellow, American Association of Pharmaceutical Sciences (AAPS)
Godswill Obioma, Registrar, National Examination Council, NECO. (2020 - 2021)
Valentine Ozigbo, Chief Executive Officer of  Transnational Corporation of Nigeria plc
Rachael Okonkwo, Actress, Dancer, and Humanitarian
Michael Ade-Ojo, Business magnate, CEO, ELIZADE NIGERIA LIMITED.
Kenneth Okonkwo, Actor and Lawyer.
Viola Onwuliri, Professor of Biochemistry and Federal Minister of Foreign Affairs and Federal Minister of State for Education  (2011-2015), Deputy Governorship Candidate, Imo State (2011)
Evelyn Okere, businesswoman, publisher, fashion designer and the Publisher of St. Eve Magazine.
Sullivan Chime, Governor of Enugu State, Nigeria (2007 – 2015)
Glory Chuku, former MBGN
Ike Ekweremadu, Former Deputy Senate President, Nigeria
Joy Emodi, Senator of the Federal Republic of Nigeria (Anambra North Senatorial Zone, Anambra State) 2003 – 2010
Obiageli Ezekwesili, Vice President (Africa Region), World Bank and Federal Minister of Education (2006–2007) and Solid Minerals Development (2005–2006), Nigeria
Nnamdi Kanu, Political Economist.
Aituaje Iruobe (WAJE), singer and songwriter
Ousman Jammeh, Gambian Foreign Minister (2009–2010)
Marcia Kure, artist
Gregory Ngaji, Senator of the Federal Republic of Nigeria (Cross River North Senatorial constituency, Cross River) 2003 – 2011
Chris Ngige, Governor of Anambra State, Nigeria (2003–2007) and Senator of the Federal Republic of Nigeria (Anambra State, Anambra Central Senatorial District), 2011 – 2015
Chimaroke Nnamani, Senator of the Federal Republic of Nigeria (Enugu East Senatorial District, Enugu State) and Governor of Enugu State (1999–2007)
Okwesilieze Nwodo, Governor of Enugu State, Nigeria (1992–1993)
Nwabueze Nwokolo, lawyer and chair of BSN: Black Solicitors Network, UK 
Jide Obi, former singer
Peter Obi, Governor of Anambra State, Nigeria (2006 – 2014)
Peter Odili, Governor of Rivers State, Nigeria (1999–2007)
Olu Oguibe, Professor of Art and African-American Studies and interim Director of the Institute for African American Studies at the University of Connecticut, Storrs
Bianca Odumegwu-Ojukwu, Special Assistant on Diaspora Affairs, Nigeria; MBGN 1988, Miss Intercontinental 1989
Chris Okotie, Televangelist and pastor of the Household of God Church International Ministries
Jacob K. Olupona, Professor of African Religious Traditions and Chair of the Committee on African studies at the Harvard Divinity School with a joint appointment as Professor of African and African American Studies in the Faculty of Arts and Sciences at Harvard University
Zack Orji, actor
Echezonachukwu Nduka, Concert pianist, poet, and musicologist.
Fabian Osuji, former Federal Minister of Education
Oserheimen Osunbor, Governor of Edo State, Nigeria (2007–2008) and Senator of the Federal Republic of Nigeria (Edo State, Edo Central Senatorial District), 1999–2007
Arunma Oteh, Director-General, Securities and Exchange Commission (SEC), Nigeria and Vice-President for Corporate Services, African Development Bank Group (AfDB) (2006–2009)
Charles Chukwuma Soludo, Governor Central Bank of Nigeria (2004–2009)
Nneka Onyeali-Ikpe, first female managing director and chief executive officer of Fidelity Bank PLC, Nigeria
Niki Tobi, Associate Justice, Supreme Court of Nigeria (2002–2010)
Obiora Udechukwu, head, Fine Arts Department, St. Lawrence University, New York
Charles Esimone, Professor of pharmaceutics and current Vice Chancellor, Nnamdi Azikiwe University, Nigeria.
Patrick Utomi, Presidential candidate for the African Democratic Congress (ADC) in the Nigerian April 2007 elections and former Director of the Center for Applied Economics, Lagos Business School, Pan African University
Uzo, New York based film director and producer.
Christian Anieke,  Nigerian Roman Catholic priest and the founding Vice Chancellor of Godfrey Okoye University
Nonso Diobi, Nigerian actor and film director
Kalu Ikeagwu, British-Nigerian actor and writer
Charles Okpaleke, businessman and film producer.
Browny Igboegwu, Actor
Amaechi Muonagor, Actor and Producer
Chidinma and Chidiebere Aneke, identical twins and Actress
Obi Emelonye, Nigerian film director.
Aloysius Agbo, Bishop of Nsukka.
Alexander Chibuzo Ibezim,  Anglican bishop
Ikechi Nwosu, Anglican archbishop[
Cossy Orjiakor, actress and singer
Jennifer Okere, Actress
Enoch Adeboye, Pastor and General Overseer of Redeemed Christian Church of God
Eromo Egbejule, Journalist, Writer and Filmmaker
Flavour N'abania, singer and songwriter
Isaac Adaka Boro, Political activist, soldier
Ashley Nwosu, Actor
Joseph Benjamin, Actor
Bobby Ologun,  Television Personality and Mixed Martial Artist

Faculty (Past and Present)
Chinua Achebe, Emeritus Professor of English, 1985
Adiele Afigbo, renowned Professor of History (1966–1992)
El Anatsui, Africa's most famous artist and Professor of Sculpture
Alexander Animalu, Emeritus Professor of Physics and former Research Scientist, Lincoln Laboratory, Massachusetts Institute of Technology (MIT), United States of America; former President, Nigerian Academy of Science and Director-General, National Mathematical Centre, Abuja
Eme Awa, Professor of Political Science and chairman, National Electoral Commission of Nigeria (NECON), 1987 – 1989
Wilberforce Echezona, musicologist 
Babs Fafunwa, Emeritus Professor of Education; First Dean of the Faculty of Education and Acting Vice-Chancellor, University of Nigeria (1964–1966); Deputy Vice-Chancellor, Obafemi Awolowo University, Ile-Ife and the first Nigerian recipient of a doctoral degree in education; former Federal Minister of Education
Eni Njoku, Professor of Botany; First Vice-Chancellor, University of Lagos, 1962 – 1965 and Vice-Chancellor, University of Nigeria, 1966 – 1967
Humphrey Nwosu, Professor of Political Science and chairman, National Electoral Commission of Nigeria (NECON), 1989 – 1993
Samuel Okoye, Professor of Astrophysics
Anya Oko Anya, Professor of Biology
Frank Nwachukwu Ndili, Nuclear Physicist and Vice Chancellor of the University of Nigeria, Nsukka.
Cyril Agodi Onwumechili, Professor of Physics and Dean of the Faculty of Science, University of Nigeria, from December 1970 - June 1971.
Nene Obianyo, Paediatric surgeon.
Lazarus Ekwueme, Musicologist.
Christopher Okigbo, Poet
Ken Saro-Wiwa, Writer
Okwui Enwezor,  Nigerian curator, art critic, writer, poet, and educator

References

University of Nigeria people
University of Nigeria